The German minesweeper M18 was a M1935 type minesweeper of the Nazi German Kriegsmarine. Built under the 1937 construction programme by Oderwerke, Stettin, M18 was launched in 1939 and entered service in 1940. She was sunk in an air raid on Kiel on 20 March 1945.

Design and construction
The M1935 type minesweeper was a development of Germany's successful minesweepers of the First World War, but with a longer hull and using oil fuel rather than coal. A first order for twelve ships (M1–M12) was placed in 1935, as part of the first shipbuilding programme for the German Navy since the Anglo-German Naval Agreement signalled an expansion of the German Navy past the constrictions of the Treaty of Versailles. Six more minesweepers of the same design (M13–M18) were ordered as part of the 1937 construction programme.

Displacement was  standard and  full load.

As built, M18 had a main gun armament of two 10.5 cm (4.1 in) SK C/32 naval guns, two 3.7 cm SK C/30 and two 2 cm Flak 30 anti-aircraft guns. 30 mines could be carried. The ship's anti-aircraft armament was increased during the Second World War, with several (4–6) more 2 cm cannon added. The ship had a complement of 95–113 men.

M18 was laid down as Yard number 804 at the Oderwerke shipyard in Stettin (now Szczecin in Poland. She was launched on 16 September 1939 and entered service on 19 March 1940.

Service
M18 served with the 1st and 3rd Minesweeper Flotillas. On the night of 7/8 July 1942, Soviet forces launched an amphibious attack with light forces against the Finnish island of Someri. M18, together with several other German and Finnish ships, provided artillery support to a Finnish counter-attack, and helped to prevent Soviet naval forces from interfering. The Soviet force was defeated on 9 July.

On 3 February 1944, M18 and sister ship  were badly damaged in an American air raid on Wilhelmshaven. By late September 1944, the advance of the Soviet armies into Estonia prompted an evacuation of German troops and refugees from Tallinn, with the last convoy leaving on 23 September. M18 helped to lay minefields to protect this evacuation and block routes out of the Gulf of Finland. Minelaying operations to cover the German retreat continued, with M18 taking part in Operation Krokodil Süd, to mine the southern exits to Moon Sound on 4–6 October.

Loss
On 20 March 1945, M18, along with sister ships M15, M16, M19 and the old minesweeper M522, was sunk in an air raid at Kiel and later scrapped.

Notes

References

Bibliography

1939 ships
Ships built in Stettin
World War II minesweepers of Germany
Maritime incidents in March 1945
Minesweepers sunk by aircraft